Gomophia egyptiaca, sometimes called the Egyptian sea star, is a species of sea star from Ophidiasteridae family found throughout much of the Indo-Pacific.

References 

Ophidiasteridae
Animals described in 1840